The Mixed relay competition at the Biathlon World Championships 2020 was held on 13 February 2020.

Results
The race was started at 14:45.

References

Mixed relay
Mixed sports competitions